The 2006/07 NBL All-Star Game (Australia) was held at the Distinctive Homes Dome in Adelaide, South Australia on 25 November 2006. The game was broadcast live on Fox Sports in Australia.

The World All-Stars held off the Aussie All-Stars to win 136-133 with Rashad Tucker of the Melbourne Tigers contributing a near triple-double with 21 points, 12 rebounds and 9 assists. He was subsequently named as the MVP of the All-Star game.

Line-up

Aussies

Starters

Reserves

World

Starters

Reserves

Dunk Competition

The Dunk Competition was won by Carlos Powell of the New Zealand Breakers from Willie Farley of the Adelaide 36ers.

See also
NBL All-Star Game (Australia)
National Basketball League (Australia)

External links
  Official site of the NBL

References
Match Report
Box Score

2006-07
Sports competitions in Adelaide
All-Star Game
2000s in Adelaide